Hope and Anchor may refer to:

 Hope and Anchor, Hammersmith, a pub in Hammersmith, London
 Hope and Anchor Tavern, a pub in Hobart, Tasmania
 Hope and Anchor, Islington, a pub in the London Borough of Islington
 Hope and Anchor, Welham Green, a pub in Hertfordshire
 The Seal of Rhode Island, which features the hope and anchor motif